Ximena Rodríguez (born 15 September 1976) is a former Colombian female tennis player.

Playing for Colombia in Fed Cup competition, Rodríguez has accumulated a win–loss record of 3–2.

ITF Circuit finals

Doubles (7-12)

References

External links

1976 births
Living people
Colombian female tennis players
20th-century Colombian women
21st-century Colombian women